William Warner "Jiggs" Ullery (May 2, 1897 – December 20, 1989) was an American football player and college football and basketball coach. He played one season for the Dayton Triangles of the National Football League in 1922.

Ullery served as the head football coach (1928–1934) and head men's basketball coach (1929–1934) at Susquehanna University in Selinsgrove, Pennsylvania.

References

External links
 
 

1897 births
1989 deaths
American football fullbacks
American football defensive backs
Basketball coaches from Ohio
Penn State Nittany Lions football players
Dayton Triangles players
Susquehanna River Hawks football coaches
Susquehanna River Hawks men's basketball coaches
People from Bradford, Ohio
Players of American football from Ohio